Psammophis phillipsii, also known by its common name olive grass racer, is a species from the genus Psammophis. The species was originally described in 1844.

References

Psammophis
Reptiles described in 1844